The 2017 Western New Mexico Mustangs football team represented Western New Mexico University in the 2017 NCAA Division II football season. They were led by eighth-year head coach Adam Clark. The Mustangs played their home games at Altamirano Stadium and were members of the Lone Star Conference.

Schedule
Western New Mexico announced its 2017 football schedule on January 23, 2017. The schedule consists of six home and five away games in the regular season. The Mustangs will host LSC foes Eastern New Mexico, Tarleton State, Texas A&M-Kingsville, and Texas-Permian Basin and will travel to Angelo State, Midwestern State, Texas A&M-Commerce, and West Texas A&M.

The Mustangs will host two of its three non-conference games against Fort Lewis from the Rocky Mountain Athletic Conference and Western Oregon and travel to San Diego from the Pioneer Football League.

References

Western New Mexico
Western New Mexico Mustangs football seasons
Western New Mexico Mustangs f